Rovinka is a village and municipality in western Slovakia in  Senec District in the Bratislava Region.

History
In historical records the village was first mentioned in 1274. Until their expulsion in 1945 the village was inhabited by Germans.

Geography
The municipality lies at an altitude of 132 metres and covers an area of 8.853 km².

Demographics
According to the 2011 census, the municipality had 2,250 inhabitants. 1,998 of inhabitants were Slovaks, 78 Hungarians, 23 Czechs, 12 Germans, 1 Kazakh and 139 others and unspecified.

References

External links/Sources

  Official page
https://web.archive.org/web/20070513023228/http://www.statistics.sk/mosmis/eng/run.html

Villages and municipalities in Senec District